Birla Foundation may refer to:

K. K. Birla Foundation, established in 1991 by Krishna Kumar Birla with mission to promote literature (especially Hindi literature) and the arts, as well as education and social work
M. P. Birla Foundation, founded by Madhav Prasadji Birla, established the M. P. Birla Foundation Higher Secondary School in Kolkata in 1988

See also
Birla family